The Golden Baseball League was an independent baseball league based in San Ramon, California, with teams located in the western United States, western Canada and northwest Mexico.

The GBL was not affiliated with Major League Baseball or the organized Minor League Baseball system, but has featured players with MLB experience (Rickey Henderson, Jose Canseco, Alex Arias, Bud Smith, Desi Wilson, José Lima, Hideki Irabu, Junior Spivey, Mark Prior). It was formed in 2004 and began play on May 26, 2005.

The GBL's presenting partner was Safeway Inc.  Other investors in the GBL  included Wheel of Fortune host Pat Sajak, former National Football League players Mike Sherrard and Christian Okoye, and executives from Cisco Systems, Taleo and Draper Fisher Jurvetson.

Over 100 players were sold to MLB organizations after it began play, with seven players already making it to a major league uniform – Dane De La Rosa, Adam Pettyjohn, Scott Richmond, Chris Jakubauskas, Sergio Romo, Bobby Cramer, and Daniel Nava.

The Golden Baseball League combined with United League Baseball and the Northern League into a new North American League for the 2011 season to form the first nationwide independent professional baseball league. However, the North American League folded after two seasons.

History
The league was founded in 2004 by Stanford University graduates Dave Kaval and Amit Patel. Kaval was the president and chief executive officer (Patel departed after the 2008 season to run his family business conglomerate in Laurel, Mississippi). Brian MacInnes was the president, and Bill Weiss was the league's secretary and historian.

Many former MLB coaches and players coached or managed in the GBL, including Kip Gross, Les Lancaster, Mike Marshall, Ozzie Virgil, Jr., Darrell Evans, Garry Templeton, Cory Snyder, Jeffrey Leonard, Gary Carter, Mike Busch, Steve Yeager, Phil Nevin, Charlie Hough, Mark Parent, Tim Johnson, Terry Kennedy, Paul Abbott, Brett Boone, Alex Arias, Rusty Meacham, and Warren Cromartie.

The beginning

The league began with a single-entity model whereby the league owned all the clubs (except Tijuana and Japan which were partnerships). Since then, several of the clubs have been sold to private groups.

In its inaugural season, the league was composed of eight teams: the Chico Outlaws, Fullerton Flyers, Long Beach Armada and San Diego Surf Dawgs in California; Mesa Miners, Surprise Fightin' Falcons and Yuma Scorpions in Arizona and the Japan Samurai Bears. All teams played their home games in city- and university-owned stadiums, with the exception of the Samurai Bears, a traveling team of Japanese players that played all of its games on the road. The Japanese team was a late entry as the Tijuana Toros, who led all of minor league baseball in attendance at over 13,000 fans a game, had jumped from the Mexican League to the GBL in December to be a charter member of the league, only to learn that the government of the Mexican state of Baja California would not permit this.

Three of the GBL's teams, Long Beach, Chico and Yuma, operated in cities that once hosted Western Baseball League teams. The WBL operated from 1995 to 2002.

On May 9, 2005, Major League Baseball's all-time stolen base leader, Rickey Henderson, signed a contract to play the 2005 season with the Surf Dawgs.

The 2005 season ended with a four-team championship tournament on Labor Day Weekend. The tournament ended with San Diego winning two games on the final day, knocking off Mesa in the second game to win the title.

José Canseco, another retired star, signed with the Surf Dawgs in 2006 as part of his attempt to return to baseball and promote his book, Juiced, along with its upcoming movie adaptation. Canseco was traded to the Armada after only one game. He said that the move was to be closer to his daughter.

Season 2: League Contracts
Before the 2006 season, Surprise was discontinued, while Mesa moved to Reno, another former Western League city, and became the Reno Silver Sox, the first GBL club in Nevada. The league moved to a six-team format and did not have the traveling Samurai Bears return.

League expands to Utah and Canada
Prior to the 2007 season, the San Diego Surf Dawgs operation was discontinued as San Diego State breached the lease agreement with the league and subsequently paid a settlement. The GBL remained at six teams by adding the St. George RoadRunners. The Utah city also hosted a Western League club from 1999 to 2001, the Zion Pioneerzz, becoming the fifth former WBL city to join the league.

In 2008, two former Northern League clubs, the Calgary Vipers and Edmonton Cracker-Cats, joined the GBL, becoming the loop's first two Canadian teams.

The league expanded to nine teams in 2009 with the addition of the Victoria Seals, while the Reno Silver Sox moved to Tucson to become the Toros. The Cracker-Cats were sold to Edmonton Oilers owner Daryl Katz and renamed the Edmonton Capitals for the 2009 season.

Tijuana joins league in 2009 and will play in 2010
On December 15, 2008, the league signed a letter of intent to place another expansion franchise in Tijuana, Mexico. After the addition of the expansion Tijuana Potros on January 13, the Armada were moved to the North Division. The Potros themselves would postpone the season due to the swine flu outbreak in Mexico.  This made all their scheduled games days off for the other nine teams and left their GBL future in serious doubt.

As planned, the Tijuana team did return for the 2010 season but came back with a new name and additional owners. The Tijuana Cimarrones were announced as a member of the GBL when the schedule was released on January 15, 2010.

Yuma becomes a Colombian affiliation in 2009
On May 20, 2009, the Yuma Sun reported that the team had signed an affiliation agreement with the Colombian Professional Baseball League (CPBL).  Under the terms of the affiliation, the CPBL will handle all on-field personnel and player issues while the team will retain control of promotions, concessions, and other front-office business. The Scorpions will act as a showcase team for players from all four CPBL teams.

Yuma Scorpion Reynaldo Rodriguez, of Cartagena, Colombia, was named GBL 2009 Rookie of the Year, the top prospect in all the independent leagues by Baseball America, and had his contract purchased by the Boston Red Sox.

Maui announced for 2010, Long Beach suspended
On September 30, 2009, the GBL announced that the Hawaiian sports and entertainment company XnE Inc. had purchased the territory rights to place teams in Hawaii and that their inaugural team would play at the War Memorial Complex in Maui in 2010. The team announced their name as Na Koa Ikaika Maui, which means the Strong Warriors of Maui.

The Long Beach Armada announced that they were suspending operations due to an ongoing stadium lease dispute with the city of Long Beach.

Kaval leaves GBL for MLS, League to expand east
Dave Kaval, co-founder and C.E.O. of the GBL since its inception in 2005, resigned to take the job as team president of the San Jose Earthquakes of Major League Soccer.

The United League and the Northern League agreed to join the GBL for the 2011 season in the formation of the new North American League. The Rockford RiverHawks, Schaumburg Flyers, Joliet Jackhammers, and Lake County Fielders planned on leaving the Northern League and join the GBL for 2011 with the new format.  United League teams joining the NAL include the Edinburg Roadrunners, Harlingen Whitewings and San Angelo Colts.

Drug testing

The league was the only independent baseball association to have drug testing. The league CEO Dave Kaval explained:

"I feel that there is no place for illegal drugs in our business. We run a family-friendly operation off the field, and illegal drug usage by our players would undermine the trust we have established with our fans. That is exactly what has happened at the MLB level. As a steward of the great game of baseball, I am proud to say that we have the most stringent drug policy in all of professional baseball."

Franchises that played

Teams that never played

Tijuana Toros from Tijuana, Mexico – Stadium was seized by Mexican military forces in January 2005 and awarded to former politicians who had struck a deal to bring a team back to the Mexican Summer League. The GBL quickly responded by forming the Japan Samurai Bears to fill the Tijuana spot on the schedule. There was also the Tijuana Potros and Tijuana Embajadores from Tijuana, Baja California.
Santa Clarita, California – Awarded franchise in 2006, but ownership was unable to find or build a ballpark.
Palm Springs, California - Awarded franchise in 2009, was expected to play in the 2012 season. The GBL and later NAL didn't allow Palm Springs to have the team play in 2010 and 2011, due to Palm Springs Stadium's substandard facility standards.

Season-by-season results

2005 Season
Standings

x-Division Champion y-Wild Card (Division champions and top two wild card teams go to Championship.)

Playoffs and Championship (4 team double-elimination, final 2 teams face in one game playoff):

Awards:

Gold Glove winners:
Pitcher: Adam Pettyjohn, Long Beach
Catcher: Cody Clark, San Diego
First base: Yuji Nerei, Samurai Bears
Second base: Kenichi Miura, Samurai Bears
Third base: Sean Walsh, Fullerton
Shortstop: Jeremy Hernandez, Long Beach
Outfielders Marcus Knight, Mesa; Billy Brown, Surprise; Travis McAndrews, Long Beach

2006 season
Standings:

z-First-half champion and best overall record, x-second-half champion (Champions of each half face in 5-game series for championship. If one team wins both halves, the team with next best overall record receives championship bid.)

Championship (best of 5 game series):

Awards:

All-League Team:
Catcher: Marcus Jensen, Reno
First base: Desi Wilson, Chico
Second base: Adam Mandel, San Diego
Third base: Henry Calderon, Yuma
Shortstop: Bret LeVier, Fullerton
Utility: Craig Kuzmic, Chico
Outfielders: Seth Pietsch, San Diego; Jason Van Meetren, Chico; Jeff LaRue, Long Beach; Scott Goodman, San Diego
Designated hitter: Peanut Williams, Fullerton
Starting Pitchers: Chris Jakubauskas, Fullerton; Andre Simpson, Long Beach; Ben Thurmond, Reno; Phil Springman, Chico; Brian Kroll, Chico; Nate Sevier, Reno
Relief Pitchers: Josh Rummonds, San Diego; Scott Schneider, Reno; E.J. Shanks, San Diego; Mike Peck, Long Beach; Wes Faust, Fullerton

Gold Glove Winners:
Pitcher: James Johnson, Reno
Catcher: Marcus Jensen, Reno
First base: Desi Wilson, Chico
Second base: Rob Gandolfo, Chico
Third base: Henry Calderon, Yuma
Shortstop: Hector Tena, Yuma
Outfielders Chris Klemm, Long Beach; Lino Garcia, Chico; Ryan Webb, Long Beach

2007 season
Standings:

x-1st half champion, z-2nd half champion and best overall record

Championship (best of 5 game series):

Awards:

All-League Team:
Catcher: Buddy Morales, Orange County
First base: Jaime Martinez, Long Beach
Second base: David Bacani, Orange County
Third base: Henry Calderon, Yuma
Shortstop: Jesse Kovacs, Chico
Utility: Ryan Stevenson, St. George
Outfielders: Daniel Nava, Chico; Kane Simmons, Reno; Johnny Kaplan, Long Beach Yosvanny Almario, Yuma
Designated hitter: Peanut Williams, Orange County
Starting Pitchers: Ben Fox, Orange County; Derek Loop, Chico; Ryan Claypool, Long Beach; Roger Luque, Yuma; Dusty Bergman, Reno
Relief Pitchers: Todd Gelatka, Chico; Dane De La Rosa, Long Beach; Anthony Pluta, St. George; Neil Hayes, Yuma

2008 season
Overall Standings:

x-1st half division champion, y-2nd half division champion

2008 All-Star Game:
2008 - United League Baseball All-Stars 8, Golden Baseball League All-Stars 5 (July 15, 2008, San Angelo, Texas)

Northern Division Playoff (best of 5 game series):

Southern Division Playoff  (best of 5 game series):

Championship (best of 5 game series):

Awards:

All-League Team:
Catcher: TBA
First base: TBA
Second base: TBA
Third base: TBA
Shortstop: TBA
Utility: TBA
Outfielders: TBA
Designated hitter: TBA
Starting Pitchers: TBA
Relief Pitchers: TBA

2009 season
Overall Standings:

x-1st half division champion, y-2nd half division champion, z-wild card

Northern Division Playoff (best of 5 game series):

Southern Division Playoff  (best of 5 game series):

Championship (best of 5 game series):

Awards:

Attendance (paid):

All-star game

2006 GBL All-Star Game
The GBL played their very first All-Star Game on July 18, 2006 at Chico's Nettleton Stadium pitting the North All-Stars against the South All-Stars.

2008 United League vs. Golden League All-Star Game
The GBL reached a two-year agreement with the United League to face off in two All-Star Games. The 2008 game was hosted by the ULB's San Angelo Colts, while the 2009 game was to be hosted by the Orange County Flyers. However, the United League went bankrupt in the off-season after 2008, causing the 2009 All-Star Game to be cancelled.

2009 Golden League All-Star Game
In replacement of the 2009 All-Star Game against the United League, the GBL held its own All-Star Game. The game was between the two divisions, taking place in St. George, Utah - home of the RoadRunners, on Tuesday, July 14. During the game, pitchers Donnie Brandt and Isaac Hess were purchased by major league organizations during the game by Milwaukee and Boston respectively. Fehlandt Lentini won the home run derby.

2010 and 2011 GBL All-Star Games
On December 9, 2009 the GBL and the Northern League announced a two-year agreement that would pit the all-stars of the two leagues against each other in the mid-summer classic. The 2010 game wAS in Tucson on July 14 while the leagues will face off in Zion, Illinois at the newest ballpark (currently under construction) in the Northern League.

GBL Instructional/Developmental Leagues
The GBL, then later the North American League, featured two small instructional leagues that helped produce future independent, minor league and even Major League Baseball standouts, including two-time World Series Champion Sergio Romo of the San Francisco Giants.  These leagues folded with the NAL in 2013.

Arizona Winter League

On November 15, 2006, the Golden Baseball League announced the Arizona Winter League, which would be a short-season instructional league for its summer league. The league began play on January 19, 2007. The Arizona Winter League has just completed its third season. In the first three years, over 130 Arizona Winter League players have been signed to professional contracts. Two of those players, Scott Richmond and Sergio Romo, are now pitching in the major leagues. The 2009 Arizona Winter League began play on January 31, 2009 and has expanded to 8 teams and almost 200 players.

Arizona Summer League

On April 3, 2009, the Golden Baseball League announced its second instructional league known as the Arizona Summer League, which is patterned after the AWL. This league consists of three teams, the Canada Miners, El Centro Imperials and San Luis Atleticos and began play in late June 2009.  The ASL had 12 players signed to pro contracts during the 2009 season.

The Bisbee Miners, Long Beach Armada and San Diego Surf Dawgs joined the ASL for the 2010 season.

Television
The Yuma Scorpions became the first franchise in the league to broadcast select games on Adelphia Cable, which were produced by Arizona Western College Television Services.
The Edmonton Capitals televised selected games by reaching an agreement with Shaw TV.
The Golden Baseball League announced they had reached a deal with iBN Sports to broadcast 40 games on the internet showing various teams.

Notes and references

External links

Golden Baseball League group on Facebook (defunct)
Edmonton and Calgary Leave Northern League
San Diego CityBeat profile by Charles Dahan
Yuma Scorpions vs. Saskatchewan Silver Sox Photos & Batting Video

 
Defunct professional sports leagues in the United States
Defunct baseball leagues in Canada
2004 establishments in California
2010 disestablishments in the United States
Defunct independent baseball leagues in the United States
Sports leagues established in 2004
San Ramon, California
Sports leagues disestablished in 2010